Praça da Bandeira Station, previously known as Lauro Müller Station, is a railway station in Praça da Bandeira, Rio de Janeiro which is serviced by the Supervia.

History 
 
The station, then known as Lauro Müller Station, was inaugurated in 1907, following a modification of the trackbed of the Central do Brasil Railroad between Central do Brasil (then known as Dom Pedro II) and São Cristóvão. In 1957, Manchete magazine described the construction of the station as follows: "(…) With [passenger] traffic increasing day by day, especially after the start of the railway services from the docks, and to avoid future complications with the lateral avenues of the new Mangue Canal, opened by the Comissão Construtora do Cais do Porto (Docklands Construction Commission), the director Francisco de Paiva Ramos, on 25th May 1903, suggested elevating the line between São Cristóvão and São Diogo, removing the level crossing on the Praia Formosa, Figueira de Melo and São Cristóvão Roads. The idea was approved, and the project was executed by the Seção Técnica da Linha (Technical Section of the Line), under the leadership of the engineer Carlos Euler, helped by his colleague Mário Martins Costa. The line elevation works, which included the construction of a metallic viaduct over the canal, near Leopoldina Station, started in 1905, with José de Andrade Pinto being the chief line engineer. With the elevation of the line, São Diogo lost its importance, and Lauro Muller Station opened. It was named after the transport minister at the time, who inaugurated the station alongside Afonso Pena, the President of the Republic". The station was renamed in the 2000s after the public square on which it's located.

Plataforms 
Platform 1A: Towards Deodoro (Stopper)
Platform 1B: Towards Central do Brasil (Stopper)

External links 
 Supervia webpage

References

SuperVia stations